Castle class may refer to:
Castle-class trawler, a class of ships constructed by the Royal Navy from 1916 to 1919
Castle-class corvette, a class of ships constructed by the Royal Navy beginning in 1943
Castle-class patrol vessel, a class of ships constructed by the Royal Navy beginning in 1980
GWR Castle class locomotive, a class of steam locomotives of the British Great Western Railway
InterCity 125 train sets operated in the United Kingdom by Great Western Railway (train operating company)

See also
 Castle series (disambiguation)